Baptiste Brochu (born September 8, 1994) is a Canadian snowboarder, competing in the discipline of snowboard cross.

Career
Brochu first appeared at a World Cup in December 2013. Brochu got on the podium for his first time (also 
his first win) in March 2016 at the World Cup in Veysonnaz, Switzerland. Brochu was ranked in the top-10 of the World Cup snowboard cross standings for the 2015–16 and 2016–17 seasons.

2018 Winter Olympics
In January 2018, Brochu was named to Canada's 2018 Olympic team.

References

1994 births
Living people
Canadian male snowboarders
Sportspeople from Saguenay, Quebec